The International Review of Cell and Molecular Biology is a scientific book series that publishes articles on plant and animal cell biology. Until 2008 it was known as the International Review of Cytology.

References

Molecular and cellular biology journals
English-language journals
Elsevier academic journals